Conwy Hospital was a community hospital in Conwy, Wales. It was managed by the Conwy & Denbighshire NHS Trust.

History
The hospital had its origins in the Conwy Union Workhouse and Infirmary which was established in 1838. It became the St Mary's and Dolwaen Public Assistance Institution in 1930 and then joined the National Health Service as the Conway Hospital for Aged Sick in 1948. After the hospital closed in 2003, the buildings were demolished in 2004 and the site was redeveloped for residential use.

References

Further reading

Defunct hospitals in Wales
Hospitals established in 1838
Hospitals in Conwy County Borough
Hospital buildings completed in 1838
Buildings and structures demolished in 2004
Demolished buildings and structures in Wales